The Alpgundkopf is a mountain, 2,177 m high, in the Allgäu Alps. It lies in the Schafalpenköpfe group, northeast of the Roßgundkopf, from which it is separated by the Alpgundscharte col. To the southeast, 383 metres away, lies the lower Alpkopf and, 1,035 metres away, the small lake of Guggersee.

Ascent 
There are no waymarked paths up the Alpgundkopf. The normal approach is a trackless route from the notch of Alpgundscharte that requires sure-footedness and mountain experience. All other ascents are not recommended due to the brittle nature of the rock.

Photographs

Literature 
 Thaddäus Steiner: Allgäuer Bergnamen, Lindenberg, Kunstverlag Josef Fink, 2007, 
 Thaddäus Steiner: Die Flurnamen der Gemeinde Oberstdorf im Allgäu, München, Selbstverlag des Verbandes für Flurnamenforschung in Bayern, 1972
 Zettler/Groth: Alpenvereinsführer Allgäuer Alpen. Munich, Bergverlag Rudolf Rother, 1984.

External links 

 Tour report

Two-thousanders of Germany
Mountains of the Alps
Mountains of Bavaria
Allgäu Alps